WZTF (102.9 FM) is a radio station broadcasting an urban adult contemporary format. Licensed to Scranton, South Carolina, United States, the station serves the Florence, South Carolina area. The station is currently owned by iHeartMedia, Inc., through licensee iHM Licenses, LLC. Its studios are located in Florence, and its transmitter is located south of Effingham, South Carolina.

History
WSQN was adult contemporary before becoming a soft AC station called "light and easy Sunny 102.9" airing a syndicated format from Broadcast Programming called AC45+. Its later formats included oldies and, under Root Communications, "Old school" R & B oldies. As WURV ("The River") it was classic rock, and it was modern rock "Rock 102.9" and then classic hits "102.9 the Point" using the letters WWRK.

In a deal announced in February 1997, Root Communications Ltd. announced plans to buy eight radio stations owned by Florence-based Atlantic Broadcasting, including WSQN. Qantum Communications Inc. purchased Florence's Root Communications Group LP stations in 2003.

On May 15, 2014, Qantum Communications announced that it would sell its 29 stations, including WZTF, to Clear Channel Communications (now iHeartMedia), in a transaction connected to Clear Channel's sale of WALK AM-FM in Patchogue, New York to Connoisseur Media via Qantum. The transaction was consummated on September 9, 2014.

Translators
In addition to the main station, WZTF has an additional translator to widen its broadcast area.

References

External links
 

ZTF
IHeartMedia radio stations
Urban adult contemporary radio stations in the United States
Radio stations established in 1991
1991 establishments in South Carolina